The tailless fruit bat (Megaerops ecaudatus)  is a species of fruit bat in the family Pteropodidae.

Distribution
Individuals have been found in the lowland primary forest at Poring in Sabah and Taleban in Thailand, Bario highland and secondary forest of Balui, both in Sarawak. M. ecaudatus ranges in the primary forest and open habitat  from Thailand, Vietnam, Peninsular Malaysia, Sumatra; Kinabalu, Danum, Tawau, and Tenom in Sabah; Temburong and Tasik Merimbun in Brunei; Bario in Sarawak; to Kapuas and Kutai in Kalimantan.

Biology and ecology
Two males and two females have been captured in various habitats. An adult female was collected in April, 1995, and adult male in April, 1996. A subadult female was taken from the Balui secondary forest in June, 1994, while an immature was collected from the primary forest in Taleban on 28 March 1997. In Cameron Highlands, Peninsula Malaysia, females were pregnant in February and extending to March and June. Females with suckling juveniles were also observed in November. A specimen MTA96004 was collected in the canopy net approximately 30 m above ground level. The specimen BD013 was collected at 1,100 m elevation in Bario upland. According to Lekagul and McNeely (1977), M. ecaudatus has been recorded both in the lowlands and on mountains up to 3,000 m in Thailand.

References

Hall LS, Gordon G. Grigg, Craig Moritz, Besar Ketol, Isa Sait, Wahab Marni and M.T. Abdullah. 2004. Biogeography of fruit bats in Southeast Asia. Sarawak Museum Journal LX(81):191-284.
Karim, C., A.A. Tuen and M.T. Abdullah. 2004. Mammals. Sarawak Museum Journal Special Issue No. 6. 80: 221—234.
Mohd. Azlan J., Ibnu Maryanto, Agus P. Kartono and M.T. Abdullah. 2003 Diversity, Relative Abundance and Conservation of Chiropterans in Kayan Mentarang National Park, East Kalimantan, Indonesia. Sarawak Museum Journal 79: 251-265.
Hall LS, Richards GC, Abdullah MT. 2002. The bats of Niah National Park, Sarawak. Sarawak Museum Journal. 78: 255-282.

External links
Bat World Sanctuary
Rodrigues Fruit Bats
Bat Conservation International

Megaerops
Bats of Southeast Asia
Bats of Indonesia
Bats of Malaysia
Mammals of Borneo
Mammals of Brunei
Mammals of Thailand
Fauna of Sumatra
Least concern biota of Asia
Mammals described in 1837